The House of Windsor is the reigning royal house of the United Kingdom and the other Commonwealth realms. In 1901, a line of the House of Saxe-Coburg and Gotha (itself a cadet branch of the House of Wettin) succeeded the House of Hanover to the British monarchy with the accession of King Edward VII, son of Queen Victoria and Prince Albert of Saxe-Coburg and Gotha. In 1917, the name of the British royal house was changed from the German Saxe-Coburg and Gotha to the English Windsor because of anti-German sentiment in the United Kingdom during the First World War. There have been five British monarchs of the House of Windsor since then: George V, Edward VIII, George VI, Elizabeth II, and Charles III. The children and male-line descendants of Queen Elizabeth II and Prince Philip also genealogically belong to the House of Oldenburg since Philip belonged to the Glücksburg branch of that house.

The monarch is head of state of fifteen sovereign states. These are the United Kingdom, Antigua and Barbuda, Australia, the Bahamas, Belize, Canada, Grenada, Jamaica, New Zealand, Papua New Guinea, Saint Kitts and Nevis, Saint Lucia, Saint Vincent and the Grenadines, Solomon Islands, and Tuvalu. As well as these separate monarchies, there are also three Crown Dependencies, fourteen British Overseas Territories and two small associated states of New Zealand: the Cook Islands and Niue.

Background

Edward VII and, in turn, his son, George V, were members of the German ducal House of Saxe-Coburg and Gotha by virtue of their descent from Albert, Prince Consort, husband of Queen Victoria, the last British monarch from the House of Hanover. High anti-German sentiment amongst the people of the British Empire during the First World War reached a peak in March 1917, when the Gotha G.IV, a heavy aircraft capable of crossing the English Channel, began bombing London directly and became a household name. In the same year, on 15 March, King George's first cousin Emperor Nicholas II of Russia was forced to abdicate, which raised the spectre of the eventual abolition of all the monarchies in Europe. The King and his family were finally persuaded to abandon all titles held under the German Crown and to change German titles and house names to anglicised versions. Hence, on 17 July 1917, a royal proclamation issued by George V declared:

The name had a long association with monarchy in Britain, through the town of Windsor, Berkshire, and Windsor Castle; the link is alluded to in the Round Tower of Windsor Castle being the basis of the badge of the House of Windsor. It was suggested by Arthur Bigge, 1st Baron Stamfordham. Upon hearing that his cousin had changed the name of the British royal house to Windsor and in reference to Shakespeare's The Merry Wives of Windsor, German Emperor Wilhelm II remarked jokingly that he planned to see "The Merry Wives of Saxe-Coburg-Gotha".

George V also restricted the use of British princely titles to his nearest relations, and in 1919, he stripped three of his German relations of their British titles and styles.

List of monarchs

Members 

The 1917 proclamation stated that the name of the Royal House and all British descendants of Victoria and Albert in the male line were to bear the name of Windsor, except for women who married into other families.

Descendants of Elizabeth II
In 1947, Princess Elizabeth (who would become Queen Elizabeth II), heir presumptive to King George VI, married Philip Mountbatten (born Prince Philip of Greece and Denmark), a member of the House of Schleswig-Holstein-Sonderburg-Glücksburg, a branch of the House of Oldenburg. A few months before his marriage, Philip abandoned his princely titles and adopted the surname Mountbatten, which was that of his maternal uncle and mentor, the Earl Mountbatten of Burma, and had itself been adopted by Lord Mountbatten's father (Philip's maternal grandfather), Prince Louis of Battenberg, in 1917. It is the literal translation of the German Battenberg, which refers to Battenberg, a small town in Hesse.

Soon after Elizabeth became Queen in 1952, Lord Mountbatten observed that because it was the standard practice for the wife in a marriage to adopt her husband's surname, the House of Mountbatten now reigned. When Elizabeth's grandmother, Queen Mary, heard of this comment, she informed British Prime Minister Winston Churchill and he later advised the Queen to issue a royal proclamation declaring that the royal house was to remain known as the House of Windsor.
This she did on 9 April 1952, officially declaring it her "Will and Pleasure that I and My children shall be styled and known as the House and Family of Windsor, and that My descendants, other than female descendants who marry and their descendants, shall bear the name of Windsor." Philip privately complained, "I am nothing but a bloody amoeba. I am the only man in the country not allowed to give his name to his own children."

On 8 February 1960, some years after both the death of Queen Mary and the resignation of Churchill, the Queen confirmed that she and her children would continue to be known as the "House and Family of Windsor", as would any agnatic descendants (through the male line of succession, or patrilineality) who enjoy the style of Royal Highness and the title of prince or princess. Still, Elizabeth also decreed that her agnatic descendants who do not have that style and title would bear the surname Mountbatten-Windsor.

This came after some months of correspondence between the Prime Minister Harold Macmillan and the constitutional expert Edward Iwi. Iwi had raised the prospect that the royal child due to be born in February 1960 would bear "the Badge of Bastardy" if it were given its mother's maiden name (Windsor) rather than its father's name (Mountbatten). Macmillan had attempted to rebuff Iwi, until the Queen advised Rab Butler in January 1960 that for some time she had her heart set on a change that would recognise the name Mountbatten. She clearly wished to make this change before the birth of her child.  The issue did not affect Prince Charles or Princess Anne, as they had been born with the name Mountbatten, before the Queen's accession to the throne. Prince Andrew was born 11 days later, on 19 February 1960.

Any future monarch can change the dynastic name through a similar royal proclamation, as royal proclamations do not have statutory authority.

Family tree

   Red-framed persons are living
   Black-framed persons are deceased
   Bold borders indicate children of British monarchs

States reigned over
At the creation of the House of Windsor, its head reigned over the British Empire. Following the end of the First World War, however, shifts took place that saw the emergence of the Dominions of the British Commonwealth as independent states. The shift was recognised in the Balfour Declaration of 1926, the Royal and Parliamentary Titles Act 1927, and the Statute of Westminster 1931. The Windsors became recognised as the royal family of multiple independent countries, a number that shifted over the decades, as some Dominions became republics and Crown colonies became realms, republics, or monarchies under a different sovereign. Since 1949, three monarchs of the House of Windsor, George VI, Elizabeth II and Charles III, have also been Head of the Commonwealth of Nations, comprising most (but not all) parts of the former British Empire and some states that were never part of it.

See also
 British royal family
 British prince
 British princess
 Descendants of George V
 Succession to the British throne

Notes

References

Further reading
 Longford, Elizabeth Harman (Countess of Longford). The Royal House of Windsor. Revised ed. Crown, 1984.
 Roberts, Andrew. The House of Windsor. University of California Press, 2000.

External links

 Royal Family name from royal.uk
 House of Windsor from royal.uk
 House of Windsor Tree from royal.gov.uk (Lord Culloden & Albert+Leopold Windsor are missing)

House of Windsor
Royal houses of Britain